Allen station was established as a wood frame farmhouse servicing the Texas Electric Railway interurban rail line from Dallas, Texas to Sherman, Texas in 1908. The Texas Interurban Railway routed hourly passenger railcars or streetcars for access to the Dallas business district and Dallas Farmers Market district. The electric rail supported two freight delivery services transporting mail, parcel post packages, and produce from the 6 A.M. to 6 P.M. hours incorporating the North Texas vicinity.

In 1912, the Texas Traction Company purchased the property constructing a new building for railway station services. By 1913, the depot was completed as a brick and mortar structure with continuation of full railway services from Dallas to Sherman. In 1917, the railway was entitled the Texas Electric Railway with service extended from Denison, Texas to Waco, Texas. The Texas Electric Railway abandoned the rail line and discontinued the rail services by 1948.

Texas Historical Commission Site
Allen Station received a historical marker in 1986 by the Texas Historical Commission recognizing the 1908 establishment as an integral chapter of the Texas railroad history.

Bibliography Pictorial

See also
 Allen Depot (Allen, Texas)
 Plano Station, Texas Electric Railway
 Texas Railroads

References

External links
 
 
 
 
 

Buildings and structures in Allen, Texas
History of Allen, Texas
Recorded Texas Historic Landmarks
1908 establishments in Texas
Railway stations in the United States opened in 1908
Former railway stations in Texas